El Sonidito is a 2008 Latin album by the Hechizeros Band known for its title track.

Composition and production 

The band, which comes from Nayarit, Mexico, described its genre as a variety of Latin rhythms involving keyboards and vocals, inspired by cumbia, quebradita, chicote, and genres including ranchera, norteño, and Latin ballads. They later called their genre "electrocumbia" and likened their rowdy ("reventón") dance music production to Sinaloan rhythm bands with a synthesizer in lieu of brass.

The album released on December 16, 2008. Their first single was the title track, "El Sonidito", followed by "Sunguirungui" later in 2009.

As of mid 2009, the band was preparing for a tour of the United States.

Reception 

The album debuted at #44 on Billboard's Top Latin Albums in early 2009. The album first gained traction on public transport in Mazatlán, Sinaloa. The title track became popular in Mexico and the United States, rising to #33 in Billboard's Hot Latin Songs later in the month, reaching #18 in March 2009. The band received a gold record in July for their sales in the United States.

The album's title song, which Billboard described as a novelty, came at a time when regional Mexican radio was playing more upbeat, wacky, regional songs following Los Pikadientes de Caborca's "La Cumbia del Río", as compared to the radio's usual love songs and ballads (corridos). The title track received strong criticism on the Internet, which the band acknowledged on balance with supporters who appreciated their presentation as simple and honest. The title track was further popularized by its inclusion in the 2013 video game Grand Theft Auto V. It had become the celebration track that the Washington Nationals baseball team played after winning games by 2019, the year they won their first World Series.

Bands who covered the title track include Chicano Batman. A popular parody video created in 2010 edited clips from the German rock band Rammstein to appear as if playing the title track.

Track listing

References 

2008 albums
Regional Mexican music albums
Spanish-language albums